Noodle Creek is a stream in the U.S. state of Texas. Noodle Creek flows for  before it joins the Clear Fork Brazos River.

According to tradition, Noodle Creek was named for the fact it often runs dry, "noodle" being local slang meaning "nothing".

References

Rivers of Texas
Rivers of Jones County, Texas
Rivers of Nolan County, Texas
Rivers of Taylor County, Texas